Chipewyan Lake Airport  is located  northeast of Chipewyan Lake, Alberta, Canada.

References

External links
Page about this airport on COPA's Places to Fly airport directory

Registered aerodromes in Alberta
Municipal District of Opportunity No. 17